Penhaligon is a surname originating in Cornwall, Great Britain.

Penhaligon may refer to:

 William Penhaligon (1837-1902), Cornish barber and perfumer, founder of Penhaligon's
 David Penhaligon (1944–1986), Liberal MP from Cornwall
 Dame Annette Penhaligon (born 1946), British politician
 Susan Penhaligon (born 1949), British actress

Other
 Penhaligon's, English perfume house
 The Penhaligon Trilogy, a series set in the Mystara realm of Dungeons & Dragons
 Penhaligon, a type of shot used in the game of Tiddlywinks